Q'anjob'al may refer to:
the Q'anjob'al people
the Q'anjob'al language